PCC Rail Tabor S.A. is a Polish rail company operating as a dependent company of PCC Rail. PCC Rail Tabor is responsible for repairs and maintenance of locomotives, mainly ET21, ET22, SM48, SM42, SM30, ST43 and ST44. Railway services:
- overhauls and periodic repairs of diesel locomotives,
- refurbishment of diesel locomotives, including rebuilding of power generators,
- periodic, regular and emergency repair of goods wagons,
- construction of coal wagons and container platforms,
- repairs to machinery and equipment for track repairs.

See also 
 Transportation in Poland
 List of railway companies
 Polish locomotives designation

Resource
 Companies official website, URL accessed at 30 December 2008

Railway companies of Poland
PCC Rail companies